Pierre George (11 October 1909 – 11 September 2006) was a French geographer.

Further reading 
 Hugh Clout: Pierre George (1909–2006), in Geographers: Biobibliographical Studies 29, 2010, pp. 35–56.

1909 births
2006 deaths
French geographers
Scientists from Paris
Members of the Académie des sciences morales et politiques
Fellows of the Royal Society of Canada
Officers of the Ordre national du Mérite
Officiers of the Ordre des Palmes Académiques
20th-century geographers